New Hampshire Route 115A (abbreviated NH 115A) is a  north–south state highway in Coos County, New Hampshire. The southern terminus of the road is at New Hampshire Route 115 south of Jefferson at Old Cherry Mountain Road. The northern terminus of NH 115A is at U.S. Route 2 in Jefferson at the Old Corner Store.

Route description
NH 115A intersects Whipple Road and Israel's River Road, designated New Hampshire Route 115B but sparsely signed as such, a continuation of the Turnpike Road, built by Colonel Whipple for access from the village of Riverton (Jefferson Mills) to Portland, Maine in the late 18th century. It also crosses the old railroad grade once used by the Boston and Maine Railroad for access to Gorham and the private siding that once serviced the Waumbek Hotel complex. The Portland-Montreal Pipe Line also crosses NH 115A, just below the old Waumbek site.  The pipeline right-of-way also serves as "Corridor 5" of the local snowmobile trail system.

The local name of NH 115A is Meadows Road, as it once served the Jefferson Meadows train station and post office. The road passes the Forest Vale Cemetery, where lies the only victim of the Stanley Slide of 1885, which brought a large part of Cherry Mountain down upon the highway.

History

NH 115A between NH 115 and NH 115B was formerly part of NH 115, including two right-angle turns, at least until the 1980s, when the current, more direct NH 115 was built.

NH 115A crosses the wide Israel River valley and passes through what was once a booming dairy industry, now represented by a single dairy farm.

Major intersections

References

External links

 New Hampshire State Route 115A on Flickr

115A
Transportation in Coös County, New Hampshire